Safwan Air Base  is a former Iraqi Air Force base in the Basra Governorate of Iraq.   It was captured by Coalition forces during Operation Iraqi Freedom in 2003.

Overview
The facility was an auxiliary airfield, consisting of a 10,000 foot runway and a small aircraft parking ramp.   In March 1991 it was the location of the Safwan Airfield Standoff and signing of the Cease-Fire which suspended Operation Desert Storm.

It was apparently abandoned after the cease-fire and was later seized by U.S. ground forces during the 2003 invasion of Iraq.   Today the airfield is abandoned in some desert/agricultural fields; the long runway has numerous tire markings on it, probably being used for touch/go landings but otherwise unused.

Safwan is located in the south of Iraq at Iraqi Kuwaiti border, along the infamous Highway of Death from the Persian Gulf War. The cease-fire negotiations between General Norman Schwarzkopf and the Iraqi delegation led by Lieutenant General Sultan Hashim Ahmad took place at Safwan airfield. Schwarzkopf's demand to hold the formal cease-fire negotiations in Iraqi territory led to the encounter between the 1st squadron, 4th Cavalry regiment (Quarterhorse) from Ft. Riley, Ks. of the U.S. 1st Infantry Division (Mechanized) and the Iraqi Republican Guard, known in military circles as The Ultimatum. This was detailed in the book Third Graders At War, as well as the book Road to Safwan.

References

Iraqi Air Force bases